Norby House, at 13 Pond St. in Thompson Falls in Sanders County, Montana, was built in 1912.  It was listed on the National Register of Historic Places in 1986.

It was built by Charles H. Doenges for Dr. J. B. Norby.  It is a bungalow/craftsman style house built on a concrete foundation.  It has a hipped roof and an original enclosed screen porch.

References

Houses on the National Register of Historic Places in Montana
Houses completed in 1912
National Register of Historic Places in Sanders County, Montana
Bungalow architecture in Montana
1912 establishments in Montana
Thompson Falls, Montana